Squalidus homozonus is a species of cyprinid fish endemic to Japan.

References

Squalidus
Fish described in 1868
Taxa named by Albert Günther